Assignment Vienna is an American drama television series aired in the United States by ABC as an element in its 1972-73 wheel series The Men. The series, created by Eric Bercovici and Jerry Ludwig, was made by Metro-Goldwyn-Mayer Television.

Synopsis

Assignment Vienna told the story of Jake Webster (Robert Conrad), an American expatriate in Vienna who was the operator of Jake's Bar & Grill, an American-style establishment near the scenic heart of the city.  In fact, the business was a cover for Jake's actual reason for being in Vienna. He was involved in tracking down various spies and international criminals at the behest of U.S. intelligence, which apparently held something against him which, if disclosed, would have resulted in his being deported from Austria and apparently then incarcerated in the United States. Jake's liaison with U.S. intelligence was a Major Caldwell (Charles Cioffi). Anton Diffring played Inspector Hoffman of the Vienna police.

The Men initially aired on Thursday nights but was moved at midseason to Saturday nights. It did not garner a large share of viewers in either time slot and none of the elements were renewed. The program was shot on location in Vienna.

Pilot

The pilot film, called Assignment: Munich and aired earlier in 1972, had the same three main characters, but a different cast (Jake, Major Caldwell, and Inspector Hoffman were played by Roy Scheider, Richard Basehart, and Werner Klemperer, respectively) and was filmed on location in Munich. The location for the series was changed to prevent any disruption to filming caused by that year's Olympic Games, and Scheider chose not to return for the series in favour of a movie career.

Score

In 2010,  Film Score Monthly released Dave Grusin's series theme and three episode scores (along with John Parker's two additional scores) as part of their five-disc collection of MGM television music, TV Omnibus: Volume One (1962-1976).

Cast
Robert Conrad as Jake Webster
Charles Cioffi as Maj. Caldwell
Anton Diffring as Inspector Hoffman

Episode list

References
Brooks, Tim and Marsh, Earle, The Complete Directory to Prime Time Network and Cable TV Shows

External links

American Broadcasting Company original programming
1972 American television series debuts
1973 American television series endings
Espionage television series
Television series about the Cold War
Television series by MGM Television
Television shows set in Vienna
1970s American drama television series